Ward 4 LLC privately funds a space in Milwaukee, Wisconsin for startup accelerators and co-working. It is currently located in the John Pritzlaff Hardware Company Building.

The 12,000 square foot space for Ward 4 is privately funded by Milwaukee County executive Chris Abele and is considered a second step for his venture investment group, CSA Partners LLC to "spur economic development" through creation of a space for early-stage companies to meet. Desk and office space are leased through membership.

Current tenants include CSA Partners LLC, Quarles & Brady, public relations/lobbying group The Firm LLC, Gener8tor, DevCodeCamp, and BrightCellars.

See also
 Argosy Foundation
 BrightStar Wisconsin Foundation
 Wisconsin Economic Development Corporation
 Wisconsin Investment Partners
 Y Combinator (company)
 Techstars
 Business incubator
 Seed accelerator
 CSA Partners

References

External links

Organizations based in Milwaukee
Philanthropic organizations based in the United States